Xiphocaris is a genus of crustaceans belonging to the monotypic family Xiphocarididae.

The species of this genus are found in the Caribbean.

Species:

Xiphocaris elongata 
Xiphocaris gomezi

References

Crustaceans